Katene Clarke (born 21 September 1999) is a New Zealand cricketer. He made his List A debut on 17 November 2019, for Northern Districts in the 2019–20 Ford Trophy. Prior to his List A debut, he was named in New Zealand's squad for the 2018 Under-19 Cricket World Cup. He made his first-class debut on 22 February 2020, for Northern Districts in the 2019–20 Plunket Shield season. He made his Twenty20 debut on 27 December 2020, for Northern Districts, against Central Stags in the 2020–21 Super Smash.

References

External links
 

1999 births
Living people
New Zealand cricketers
Northern Districts cricketers
Place of birth missing (living people)